Abraham and Onesimus of Kiev were monks of the Kiev caves and lived in 12-13 c.

They, with several others, are commemorated on Saturday after 28 September. 

The others commemorated on that day include:
Alexius of Kiev,
Helladius of Kiev,
Sisoes of Kiev,
Theophilus of Kiev,
John of Kiev (an infant), and
John of Kiev (an adult).
Kiev Pechersk Lavra is an orthodox monastery which was founded by the monk St. Anthony Pechersky in 1051 at the caves near Kiev (now in the center of the city). In 11th century Lavra became the center of spreading of Christianity in Ancient Rus'.

Abraham and Onesimus were buried at the Near Caves. The feast day of Abraham, the hermit, is 21 August.
The feast day of Onesimus, the hermit, is 17 October.

References

External sources 
Holweck, F. G. A Biographical Dictionary of the Saints. St. Louis, MO: B. Herder Book Co. 1924.

Year of birth missing
Year of death missing
Saints duos
Russian saints of the Eastern Orthodox Church
Christian saints in unknown century
Monks of Kyiv Pechersk Lavra